An optical axis is a line along which there is some degree of rotational symmetry in an optical system such as a camera lens, microscope or telescopic sight. 

The optical axis is an imaginary line that defines the path along which light propagates through the system, up to first approximation. For a system composed of simple lenses and mirrors, the axis passes through the center of curvature of each surface, and coincides with the axis of rotational symmetry. The optical axis is often coincident with the system's mechanical axis, but not always, as in the case of off-axis optical systems.

For an optical fiber, the optical axis is along the center of the fiber core, and is also known as the fiber axis.

See also
 Ray (optics)
 Cardinal point (optics)
 Antenna boresight

References
 
 

Geometrical optics